Vadali is an Indian village located 2 kilometers away from Mudinepalli mandal, Krishna district, Andhra Pradesh, situated near Machilipatnam.

See also

 Mudinepalli
 Krishna district
 Andhra Pradesh

References 

Villages in Krishna district